Pieter Daniël Eugenius MacPherson (Armentières (France), 4 April 1792 - Maastricht, 19 January 1846) was a Dutch member of the civil service, politician and King's Commissioner.

MacPherson was a civil servant who rose in rank from 1816. In 1845 he was created King's Commissioner (titled 'governor') of the southern Dutch province of Limburg but he got ill after having served only one month in office.

MacPherson married Rose Marie Jeanne van Meeuwen, a member of the Catholic noble family Van Meeuwen.

The couple's Neoclassical grave monuments in the Tongerseweg Cemetery in Maastricht are National Heritage Monuments (rijksmonumenten).

1792 births
1846 deaths
People from Armentières
Dutch politicians